Bărbulești is a commune located in Ialomița County, Muntenia, Romania. It is composed of a single village, Bărbulești, which was part of Armășești commune until being split off as a separate entity in 2006. 

The commune is located west of the city of Urziceni, on the banks of the Sărata River.  It is crossed by national road DN1D, which connects Urziceni with Ploiești.

According to the 2011 census, the population of Bărbulești is composed of 79.7% Roma, 2.64% Romanians, and 17.66% of unknown ethnic origin. The inhabitants are known as Ursari.

References

Communes in Ialomița County
Localities in Muntenia
Romani communities in Romania